Faerberia is a fungal genus in the family Polyporaceae. It is a monotypic genus, containing the single species Faerberia carbonaria, which is commonly known as the firesite funnel due to its habitat of burned soil.

Taxonomy 
This species was originally described in 1805 as Merulius carbonarius by botanists Johannes Baptista von Albertini and Lewis David de Schweinitz. Faerberia was circumscribed in 1981 by Czech mycologist Zdeněk Pouzar.

Description 
Faerberia carbonaria is a small funnel mushroom with tough grey-white flesh. Although it belongs to the family Polyporaceae it does have gills. As a somewhat rare, monotypic, gilled polypore with a habitat of burned soil it is therefore quite an unusual species.

Cap: 0.5-2cm. Funnel shaped and umbilicate, smooth or lightly fibrous texture. The cap margin is usually scalloped and inrolled. Stem: 1.5-7cm. Often curved, irregular and fused together above the swollen base which sometimes displays white rhizoids. Gills: Grey, becoming paler towards the stipe. Thick, decurrent and usually with significant forking. Spore print: White. Spores: Ellipsoid, smooth, non-amyloid. 8-9.5 x 4.5-5.5 μm. Taste: Indefinite and mild. Smell: Faint and indefinite.

Habitat and Distribution 
F. carbonaria grows on burned soil with woodland fire sites being its most common habitat. It may grow in small trooping groups or be found individually but it is an uncommon find appearing through Summer and Autumn.

Edibility 
Whilst it is an edible mushroom it is regarded as a poor edible due to its tough texture, mild taste and general rarity.

References

Fungi described in 1981
Polyporaceae
Monotypic Basidiomycota genera